Gnetum latifolium is an evergreen plant in the family Gnetaceae with a broad distribution across South East Asia. Although some of its habitat is threatened by logging and forest conversion to crops, its broad distribution afforded it an assessment of "least concern" according to The IUCN Red List of Threatened Species.

Several varieties are accepted:
 Gnetum latifolium var. latifolium
 Gnetum latifolium var. funiculare Markgr.
 Gnetum latifolium var. laxifrutescens (Elmer) Markgr.
 Gnetum latifolium var. longipes (Markgr.) T.H.Nguyên
 Gnetum latifolium var. macropodum (Kurz) Markgr.
 Gnetum latifolium var. minus (Foxw.) Markgr.

References

Gnetaceae
Oil seeds